The 1999–2000 NBA season was the Clippers' 30th season in the National Basketball Association, and their 16th season in Los Angeles. The Clippers began playing in their new arena, the Staples Center, and are co-tenants with their crosstown rival, the Los Angeles Lakers. In the 1999 NBA draft, the Clippers selected Lamar Odom from the University of Rhode Island with the fourth overall pick. During the off-season, the team acquired Derek Anderson from the Cleveland Cavaliers, and acquired Eric Murdock from the New Jersey Nets.

After a 4–7 start to the season, the Clippers continued to struggle losing nine consecutive games, then lost ten straight games in January, and posted a 13-game losing streak in February. Head coach Chris Ford was fired after an 11–34 start, and was replaced with assistant Jim Todd. Ford would return coaching for the Philadelphia 76ers midway through the 2003–04 season. At midseason, the team signed free agent Jeff McInnis, then released Troy Hudson to free agency in March, as he averaged 8.8 points and 3.9 assists per game in 62 games. The Clippers then suffered a 17-game losing streak in the final two months of the season, finishing last place in the Pacific Division with a league worst record of 15–67.

Odom provided a bright spot as he averaged 16.6 points, 7.8 rebounds, 4.2 assists and 1.3 blocks per game, was named to the NBA All-Rookie First Team, and finished in third place in Rookie of the Year voting. In addition, Maurice Taylor averaged 17.1 points and 6.5 rebounds per game, while Anderson provided the team with 16.9 points and 1.4 steals per game, second-year forward Tyrone Nesby contributed 13.3 points per game, second-year center Michael Olowokandi provided with 9.8 points, 8.2 rebounds and 1.8 blocks per game, and three-point specialist Eric Piatkowski contributed 8.7 points per game. 

Following the season, Anderson signed as a free agent with the San Antonio Spurs, while Taylor signed with the Houston Rockets, Murdock retired and Todd was fired as head coach.

Draft picks

Roster

Roster Notes
 Point guard Troy Hudson was waived on March 27.
 Power forward Mario Bennett becomes the 7th former Laker to play with the crosstown rival Clippers.
 Power forward Pete Chilcutt played for team twice in the same season. Played for the team on a 10-day contract in January later released after it expired. Played for the Cleveland Cavaliers on another 10-day contract then released after that expired. Came back to the Clippers which signed for the rest of the season.

Regular season

Season standings

z - clinched division title
y - clinched division title
x - clinched playoff spot

Record vs. opponents

Game log

Player statistics

Player Statistics Citation:

Awards and records
 Lamar Odom, NBA All-Rookie Team, First Team

Transactions
The Clippers have been involved in the following transactions during the 1999-2000 season.

Trades

Re-signed

Additions

Subtractions

Player Transactions Citation:

References

Los Angeles Clippers seasons
Los Angeles Clippers